Sidney Lee Christie (April 17, 1903 – February 15, 1974) was a United States district judge of the United States District Court for the Northern District of West Virginia and the United States District Court for the Southern District of West Virginia.

Education and career

Born in Sinks Grove, West Virginia, Christie received a Bachelor of Business degree from Dunsmore Business College (now closed) in 1924 and a Bachelor of Laws from Cumberland University's law school (now the Cumberland School of Law at Samford University) in 1928. He was in private practice from 1928 to 1960. He was divorce commissioner for the Circuit Court of McDowell County, West Virginia. He was a judge of the Circuit Court for the 8th Judicial Circuit of West Virginia from 1961 to 1964.

Federal judicial service

Christie was nominated by President Lyndon B. Johnson on April 15, 1964, to a joint seat on the United States District Court for the Northern District of West Virginia and the United States District Court for the Southern District of West Virginia vacated by Judge Harry Evans Watkins. He was confirmed by the United States Senate on April 30, 1964, and received his commission on May 1, 1964. He served as Chief Judge of the Southern District from 1971 to 1973. His service was terminated on February 15, 1974, due to his death.

References

Sources
 

1903 births
1974 deaths
20th-century American judges
20th-century American lawyers
Cumberland School of Law alumni
Judges of the United States District Court for the Northern District of West Virginia
Judges of the United States District Court for the Southern District of West Virginia
People from McDowell County, West Virginia
People from Monroe County, West Virginia
United States district court judges appointed by Lyndon B. Johnson
West Virginia circuit court judges
West Virginia lawyers